Metarctia galla is a moth of the  subfamily Arctiinae. It was described by Rougeot in 1977. It is found in Ethiopia.

References

External links
 Natural History Museum Lepidoptera generic names catalog

Endemic fauna of Ethiopia
Metarctia
Moths described in 1977